Akihito is a genus of gobies native to streams in Vanuatu.

Etymology 
This genus is named after Japanese Emperor Akihito who has contributed much to the study of gobies.

Species
There are currently two recognized species in this genus:
 Akihito futuna Keith, Marquet & Watson, 2008 (Futuna's emperor)
 Akihito vanuatu Watson, Keith & Marquet, 2007 (Vanuatu's emperor)

See also
Exyrias akihito, species of the genus Exyrias named after Akihito

References

Sicydiinae
Ray-finned fish genera
Endemic fauna of Vanuatu
Taxa named by Philippe Keith